Colorado Springs City Auditorium is a historic auditorium in Colorado Springs, Colorado. Completed in 1923, the auditorium still serves the city of Colorado Springs by way of hosting various events throughout the year. The building, cost $424,910 at the time, was primarily used for concerts, theatre performances and graduations. The plaque above the stage is inscribed, "USUI CIVIUM DECORI URBUS", or "For the use of the people and the glory of the city." In the 1940s, a local promoter, Abe Marylander, brought wrestling exhibitions and boxing matches to the facility. As the years passed, the City Auditorium has played host to various musical concerts, the Harlem Globetrotters, many conventions and trade shows, professional wrestling, boxing, mixed martial arts, roller derby and more. The City Auditorium was added to the National Register of Historic Places on November 7, 1995.

The Pikemasters Model Railroad club is housed in the Auditorium's basement. Located in the old Colorado Springs Police firing range, as of 2019 they hosted meetings every Thursday night, at which visitors were welcome.

See also
National Register of Historic Places listings in El Paso County, Colorado

References

External links
City of Colorado Springs - City Auditorium

Theatres on the National Register of Historic Places in Colorado
Neoclassical architecture in Colorado
Music venues completed in 1922
Buildings and structures in Colorado Springs, Colorado
Music venues in Colorado
Tourist attractions in Colorado Springs, Colorado
National Register of Historic Places in Colorado Springs, Colorado
Event venues on the National Register of Historic Places in Colorado